Itchepackesassa Creek is a stream in Hillsborough County and Polk County, Florida, in the United States.

Itchepackesassa is a name derived from the Muskogee language meaning "medicinal plant".

See also
List of rivers of Florida

References

Rivers of Hillsborough County, Florida
Rivers of Polk County, Florida
Rivers of Florida